The Mokihinui Hydro was a proposed hydroelectric dam and power station planned for conservation land on the Mōkihinui River on the West Coast of New Zealand. The project by Meridian Energy was expected to cost $300 million.

In April 2010, resource consents to dam the Mōkihinui River were granted to Meridian. In May 2010 the Department of Conservation lodged an appeal with the Environment Court. On 22 May 2012 Meridian Energy cancelled the project, withdrawing it from the Environment Court. The project was withdrawn due to high costs and environmental concerns and the project's risks and uncertainties.

Description
The  power station was expected to generate up to  a year, or 14 percent more than the annual electricity consumption of the entire West Coast region.

Consultation
In 2007, Meridian Energy Limited consulted affected parties about its proposal to place a hydro-electric dam on the Mōhikinui River. Meridian Energy began investigating the proposal in 2006, following from similar studies conducted by the New Zealand Ministry of Works in the 1960s and 1970s. On 15 March 2008, the West Coast Regional Council called for public submissions on Meridian's applications for resource consents. Forest and Bird opposed the dam and accused Meridian of not making public a report from Landcare Research that advised that the hydro scheme would cause significant adverse environmental effects.

Recreational use after construction
Meridian Energy stated that there would be recreational benefits with the lake formed by the proposed dam. Boat ramps would be provided for access onto the new lake. A local trust planned and built a 85km walking and mountain biking track, called the Old Ghost Road, pushed through to Lyell, following a historic gold miners' route. This would have been impossible with the river being dammed.

Opposition
Opposition to the proposal had been expressed by a number of conservation, recreational, environmental and fishing organisations including:
Buller Conservation Group 
Council of Outdoor Recreation Associations of NZ
Department of Conservation
Federated Mountain Clubs
Fish and Game New Zealand 
Royal Forest and Bird Protection Society of New Zealand
Green Party of Aotearoa New Zealand
NZ Federation of Freshwater anglers
New Zealand Historic Places Trust
NZ Rafting Association
NZ Recreational Canoeing Association
West Coast Environmental Network
West Coast Tai Poutini Conservation Board
West Coast Waitbaiter's Association
World Wildlife Fund NZ

In April 2010, the Department of Conservation stated that it had lodged an appeal with the Environment Court of the decision to grant the resource consents to Meridian Energy.

See also

Electricity sector in New Zealand
List of power stations in New Zealand

References

External links
The Mokihinui Hydro Proposal – resource consent applications, submissions and decisions of the hearing panel considering the proposal on behalf of the Buller District Council and the West Coast Regional Council
Mokihinui Hydro Proposal at Meridian Energy
Save the Mokihinui: Too Precious to Dam – Forest and Bird campaign
A tale of two rivers a film by Dave Kwant and Bill Parks
Hydro Xtreme the next level hydro

Hydroelectric power stations in New Zealand
Buller District
Cancelled hydroelectric power stations
Buildings and structures in the West Coast, New Zealand
Proposed renewable energy power stations in New Zealand